Jim Threat and the Vultures are a punk rock band that were formed in Dalkeith, Scotland, in 2013 by songwriter and guitarist Jim Threat. The initial line up included bassist Lewis Greenhow & drummer Rikki Smith. The addition of a second guitarist, Kieran Gallagher, took place in 2016.
The band were formed out of the ashes of Scottish punk rock stalwarts The Threats.

The band have been described by the alternative rock website Louder Than War as "Edinburgh's best kept secret."

Discography
 Wargames (2013)
 Afraid of the Dark (2016)

References

Musical groups established in 2013
Scottish punk rock groups
People from Dalkeith
2013 establishments in Scotland